In enzymology, a xylulokinase is an enzyme that catalyzes the chemical reaction

 ATP + D-xylulose  ADP + D-xylulose 5-phosphate

Thus, the two substrates of this enzyme are ATP and D-xylulose, whereas its two products are ADP and D-xylulose 5-phosphate.

This enzyme belongs to the family of transferases, specifically those transferring phosphorus-containing groups (phosphotransferases) with an alcohol group as acceptor.  The systematic name of this enzyme class is ATP:D-xylulose 5-phosphotransferase. Other names in common use include xylulokinase (phosphorylating), and D-xylulokinase.  This enzyme participates in pentose and glucuronate interconversions.

Structural studies 

Applications

Hydrogen production 

In 2014 a low-temperature , atmospheric-pressure enzyme-driven process to convert xylose into hydrogen with nearly 100% of the theoretical yield was announced. The process employs 13 enzymes, including xylulokinase.

References

Further reading 

 
 
 
 
 

EC 2.7.1
Enzymes of known structure